Hańcza is a lake in Suwałki Region, Podlaskie Voivodeship, Poland. It is 311.4 ha large, 4.5 km long and 1.2 km wide. It is the deepest lake in Poland with maximum depth of 108.5 m. The Czarna Hańcza river flows through it.

Lakes of Podlaskie Voivodeship
Underwater diving sites in Poland
Suwałki County